Cecil Alphonso Marshall (13 September 1939 – 10 September 2011) was a Trinidadian-born Canadian cricketer. He played two One Day Internationals for Canada.  After playing for Canada he played and umpired cricket in Ottawa.

References

External links

2011 deaths
Canadian cricketers
Canada One Day International cricketers
Cricketers at the 1979 Cricket World Cup
Trinidad and Tobago emigrants to Canada
1939 births
Trinidad and Tobago cricketers